Pat Gallagher (born April 21, 1974) is a Democratic member of the Pennsylvania House of Representatives, representing the 173rd District since 2023.

External links

References 

Living people
Democratic Party members of the Pennsylvania House of Representatives
21st-century American politicians
1974 births